Willey Point is a conspicuous rock point along the west side of Beardmore Glacier, marking the south side of the mouth of Berwick Glacier. Named by Advisory Committee on Antarctic Names (US-ACAN) for Francis J. Willey III, United States Antarctic Research Program (USARP) meteorologist at Hallett Station, 1963.

Headlands of the Ross Dependency
Shackleton Coast